The Longmeadow Parkway is a bypass of Algonquin, Illinois, that is partially open with the remainder under construction. The project is expected to be completed in late 2024.

Route description
The proposed road passes through portions of the villages of Algonquin, Carpentersville and Barrington Hills, as well as unincorporated areas of Kane County. From Huntley Road to the Fox River, the corridor primarily traverses mostly undeveloped properties or new subdivisions; these subdivisions were developed with a dedicated right-of-way to accommodate the proposed corridor. After crossing the river, the corridor parallels existing Bolz Road, to the eastern project terminus at IL 62.

The land between IL 31 and the Fox River is currently a farm. The planning process and funding of the Longmeadow Parkway made possible the preservation of this open land as the Brunner Family Forest Preserve. The Parkway will bisect the Preserve with a pedestrian overpass linking the two sections.

History
Until the 1950s all bridges crossing the Fox River in Kane County were located on the main streets of the towns along the river. Starting with Interstate 90 (I-90) in 1958 and the Elgin Bypass in 1962, planners have added additional bridges between the historic towns. Later the Fabyan Parkway bridge between Geneva and Batavia was added. In 1990, a Congressional earmark funded the Fox River Study to identified additional bypass routes to relieve congestion created by additional population west of the Fox River. One of the recommended routes was the Longmeadow Parkway. This corridor would connect two parallel routes that traveled in a northwest–southeast direction. Huntley Road crossed the Fox River on a two lane bridge in downtown Carpentersville, and Illinois Route 62 (IL 62) crossed the Fox River in downtown Algonquin. Congestion on each bridge was increased by nearby a traffic light with IL 31. To relieve congestion in Algonquin, IL 31 was moved further west away from the river. The Western Algonquin Bypass opened to traffic in September 2014. The bypass has a diamond interchange with Algonquin Road. The bypass removes through traffic from Main Street at the intersection of Main Street and Algonquin Road. (IL 62) in downtown Algonquin. However, traffic planners continued to press for the Longmeadow Parkway as a means for relieving traffic in both Carpentersville and Algonquin as well as enhance travel to Huntley. 

The project was earmarked $4 million in federal SAFETEA-LU funds, $15.4 million in federal Surface Transportation Program funds, $2.1 million in federal Congestion Mitigation and Air Quality funds, nearly $1 million in state of Illinois Truck Access Route Program funds, and an additional $45.2 million commitment from the state of Illinois. The current estimated total cost of the project is $160 million. With limited options to address the funding shortfall, eleven local governments in the Upper Fox Valley region passed resolutions requesting that Kane County consider funding the bridge through a user fee (toll funding). Based upon this request, the Kane County Board agreed to establish a Longmeadow Parkway Toll Bridge Task Force.

In 2015 and 2016 various lawsuits were filed in an effort to halt construction based upon environmental concerns.

In response to traffic projections on the eastern terminus of the parkway, the Illinois Department of Transportation is conducting a study that is considering upgrading IL-62 to a divided four-lane road eastward to IL-59.

Tolling
To fill a gap in funding, in November 2018, Kane County issued $27.8 million in bonds supported by tolls from the bridge. In September 2018, Kane County and the Illinois State Toll Highway Authority entered into an agreement to install all-electronic I-Pass tolling for the bridge. The toll plaza will be located on the eastern end of the bridge, and is projected to cost $1.1 million. All portions of the parkway other than the bridge will be toll-free, and no federal funds are being used to construct the toll bridge portion of the project.

Consultants studies justify a $0.75 to $0.95 toll for a one-way trip in an automobile.

Major intersections

References

External links

 Official webpage
 Computer visualization

Toll bridges in Illinois
Transportation in Kane County, Illinois
Bypasses
Algonquin, Illinois
Carpentersville, Illinois